Ferdinand Victor Blundstone (1882–1951) was a Swiss-born sculptor who worked in England. His father was Charles Blundstone, an India rubber merchant who was born in Manchester, England. He studied at the South London Technical Art School and Royal Academy Schools.

Blundstone's works include portraits and sculptures. After the Great War he executed several war memorials, including Folkestone War Memorial (now Grade II* listed).

Education
Blundstone studied Art at Ashton-under-Lyne and then at South London Technical Art School before entering the Royal Academy Schools. There his awards included the Landseer Scholarship which he was awarded in 1904 for one of his sculptures. He won a second place prize for a model in 1905. Two years later he was awarded a one-year Landseer Scholarship. Also in 1907 he won a traveling studentship of £200 and a gold medal.

Private life

Blundstone lived in Manchester in about 1908. He may have lived in Heaton Chapel (northern part of Stockport in Greater Manchester) with his family during World War I. London was his home from about 1919 to 1951.

Career
When Blundstone established himself as a sculptor, he had studios in London and in 1907 moved to Stamford Bridge Studios. In about 1907 he had a studio at Clifton Hill Studio and in 1918 he moved to St. John's Wood.

Works
The following is a partial list of Blundstone's works.

Professional associations

Blundstone (died 1951) was a member of the following associations:
 1919–1951 – Member of Royal Society of British Sculptors
 1921–1923 – Member of council Royal Society of British Sculptors
 1924–1931 – Member of Art Workers' Guild
 1926–1951 – Fellow of Royal Society of British Sculptors
 1935–1936 – Member of council Royal Society of British Sculptors

Exhibits and competitions

Blundstone exhibitions entries include portraits, statues, trophies and war memorials:
 1903 – 'Tiger at Bay' shown at the Corporation of Manchester Art Gallery, Twenty-First Autumn Exhibition
 1907 – Jacob Wrestling with the Angel was shown at Corporation of Manchester Art Gallery, Twenty-Fifth Autumn Exhibition
 1907–1944 – at The Exhibition of the Royal Academy of Arts (Summer Exhibition)
 1908 – Multiple works exhibited at Leeds City Art Gallery, The Spring Exhibition
 1916 – Design for a Garden Figure shown at Arts and Crafts Exhibition Society: Eleventh Exhibition
 1925 – For his garden sculpture, he won the Paris Exhibition's silver medal.
 1927 – The age of imagination was shown at The Exhibition of the Royal Scottish Academy of Painting, Sculpture and Architecture, The One-Hundred-and-First

His competition attendance included:
 1904 – Landseer Scholarships (Royal Academy of Arts) (Won)
 1907 – Landseer Scholarships (Royal Academy of Arts) (Won)
 1920 –  Folkestone Memorial Competition (Folkestone Council), 1920 (Won)
 1931–1932 – Memorial for Animals, for the Prevention of Cruelty to Animals (Royal Society of British Sculptors) (Participant, awarded £20)

Notes

References

External links
 Portrait of Ferdinand Victor Blundstone

1882 births
1951 deaths
English sculptors
English male sculptors
World War I artists
World War I memorials in the United Kingdom
20th-century war artists
British war artists
20th-century British sculptors
British expatriates in Switzerland